Runcorn is an industrial town in Halton, Cheshire, England, on the south bank of the River Mersey where it narrows at Runcorn Gap. In the town are the 61 buildings that are recorded in the National Heritage List for England as designated listed buildings in the current urban area of Runcorn, including the districts of Runcorn, Halton, Weston, Weston Point, and Norton. Two of these are classified as being in Grade I, nine in Grade II*, and fifty in Grade II.

In the United Kingdom, the term "listed building" refers to a building or other structure officially designated as being of special architectural, historical or cultural significance. These buildings are in three grades: Grade I consists of buildings of outstanding architectural or historical interest; Grade II* includes particularly significant buildings of more than local interest; Grade II consists of buildings of special architectural or historical interest. Buildings in England are listed by the Secretary of State for Culture, Media and Sport on recommendations provided by English Heritage, which also determines the grading.

Before the Industrial Revolution, the area contained the separate settlements of Runcorn, Higher Runcorn, Halton, Weston, Weston Point, and Norton. The administrative functions of the area were initially concentrated in Halton, which contained a castle and a court, while the parish church was in Runcorn. The population increase associated with industrialisation resulted in considerable expansion, so that the formerly discrete settlements were absorbed into the current urban area, much of which dates from the 19th and 20th centuries. The listed buildings are concentrated in Halton Village, which has 20, and Runcorn Town Centre, which has 16.

The listed buildings can be divided by date into three groups: ancient structures, structures built during the two centuries before the Industrial Revolution, and those built during or after it.

Halton Castle and Norton Priory date from the 11th and 12th centuries, and are now in ruins. Structures built before the Industrial Revolution reflect society as it was at that time, and the main occupations of farming and fishing. They include farmhouses, such as the building known as the Seneschal's House, which dates from 1598 and is the oldest standing building in the urban area; buildings relating to stately homes, such as the loggia and ice house in the grounds of Norton Priory; domestic buildings, such as Halton Old Hall, and buildings relating to the church, such as Halton Vicarage and the adjacent Chesshyre Library.

The diversity of Runcorn's buildings increased during the Industrial Revolution. Structures such as Bridgewater House were associated with industry, while large domestic buildings such as Halton Grange were financed by the new wealth created. The enlarged town required new civic buildings such as the Old Police Station (originally a Town Hall) and transport infrastructure such as the railway bridge and the tide dock, while the needs of the growing population were met by structures such as Norton Water Tower. All of the listed churches were built in the 19th century; architects include John Douglas, Anthony Salvin, Sir George Gilbert Scott, and Edmund Sharpe. The most recent listed structure is the Silver Jubilee Bridge, constructed in 1961.

Except for the iron or steel included in the bridges and the water tower, the structures are built in brick or stone. The stone is almost invariably red sandstone, obtained from local quarries in the Runcorn, Weston, and Halton areas. Unless stated otherwise, the buildings (except the bridges and the water tower) are constructed in local red sandstone with slate roofs. Their locations can be found on the map of all coordinates.

Key

Listed buildings

See also

Listed buildings in Runcorn (rural area)

References
Citations

Sources

Runcorn
Buildings and structures in Runcorn
Runcorn